Willoch's Second Cabinet was a majority, centre-right government consisting of the Conservative, Centre, Christian Democratic parties. It succeeded the Conservative First cabinet Willoch in mid-term to secure a majority, right-winged government, and sat from 8 June 1983 to 9 May 1986. It survived the 1985 election, but it was replaced by the Labour Brundtland's Second Cabinet, after it failed a vote of confidence in the Parliament of Norway seven months later.

Cabinet members

|}

References

See also
 First cabinet Willoch
 Norwegian Council of State
 Government of Norway
 List of Norwegian governments

Willoch 2
Willoch 1
Willoch 1
Willoch 1
1983 establishments in Norway
1986 disestablishments in Norway
Cabinets established in 1983
Cabinets disestablished in 1986